Sitthisak Suphalak (born April 23, 1984) is a Thai weightlifter. He won the silver medal for the 69 kg class at the 2007 Southeast Asian Games in Bangkok, Thailand, with a total of 299 kilograms.

Suphalak represented Thailand at the 2008 Summer Olympics in Beijing, where he competed for the men's lightweight category (69 kg). Suphalak placed eighth in this event, as he successfully lifted 147 kg in the single-motion snatch, and hoisted 171 kg in the two-part, shoulder-to-overhead clean and jerk, for a total of 318 kg.

References

External links
NBC 2008 Olympics profile

Sitthisak Suphalak
1984 births
Living people
Sitthisak Suphalak
Weightlifters at the 2008 Summer Olympics
Weightlifters at the 2006 Asian Games
Sitthisak Suphalak
Southeast Asian Games medalists in weightlifting
Competitors at the 2007 Southeast Asian Games
Sitthisak Suphalak
Sitthisak Suphalak